George Robert Smith (February 17, 1860 – February 20, 1922) was a Canadian politician.

Biography 
Born in Newark, New Jersey, Smith emigrated to Canada in 1876. He was a co-founder and president of the Canadian Mining Institute. He was president of Canadian Auto and Taxicab and was a member of the Montreal Board of Trade.

Smith served in the Canadian Militia as a Major with the Richmond based 11th Hussars in command of a Squadron.

He was elected to the Legislative Assembly of Quebec for Mégantic in 1897. A Liberal, he was acclaimed in 1900 and re-elected in 1904. He was defeated in 1908. He was appointed to the Legislative Council of Quebec for Victoria in 1911. He died in office in Sherbrooke, Quebec in 1922.

References

1860 births
1922 deaths
American emigrants to Canada
Quebec Liberal Party MLCs
Quebec Liberal Party MNAs
Politicians from Newark, New Jersey
Anglophone Quebec people
Canadian Militia officers
7th/11th Hussars officers